Marcell Strebek (born 31 July 1975) is a Hungarian football manager who manages THSE Sashalom.

Managerial career
In an interview with Pesti Foci, Strebek said that he hoped that his team would prosper in the second half of the 2016–17 BLASZ season.

Strebek's team won two consecutive matches in the 2017–18 Nemzeti Bajnokság III season with THSE Sashalom.

References

Sources
THSE Sashalom official website 

1975 births
Living people
Hungarian football managers